Eupithecia scabrogata is a moth in the family Geometridae first described by Pearsall in 1912. It is found in western North America from British Columbia to California and Arizona.

The wingspan is about 19 mm. The forewings are smoky brown with obscure crosslines. Adults have been recorded on wing from November to March and in May, possibly representing a second generation.

The larvae feed on the flowers of Arbutus pungens. They are cryptically patterned and colored to match the flowers of their host plant.

References

Moths described in 1912
scabrogata
Moths of North America